Belmont Filmhouse was an arts cinema on Belmont Street, Aberdeen, Scotland which showed a mixture of films that generally would not be shown in a chain cinema and mainstream films. The cinema building is the property of Aberdeen City Council.

History
The building was constructed in 1896 as a trades hall to a design by architects, Alexander Ellis and Robert Gordon Wilson. It was principally used for meetings of Aberdeen's newly established Labour Movement. The first film was shown on the premises in 1898, and featured footage of Queen Victoria at Balmoral Castle, establishing a tradition of hosting visiting cinema shows. In 1910, the Trades Hall was converted into a permanent cinema called the Coliseum. It was refurbished and reopened as the New Kinema in 1921.

After another refurbishment in 1935, it was renamed the Belmont Cinema. It closed in 1953, and the building was converted into a warehouse. It reopened under lease to Picturehouse Cinemas as the Belmont Picturehouse in September 2000, after a major refurbishment by Aberdeen City Council with assistance from the National Lottery and Scottish Screen. 

After some turmoil and uncertainty, the lease for exploitation on the Belmont to Picturehouse was extended in April 2011 for a further ten years. However, with the purchase of Picturehouse Cinemas by Cineworld, the company were forced to sell the Belmont due to a ruling by the Competition Commission that it had created unfair competition in the city. In April 2014, Centre for the Moving Image (CMI) took over the lease and renamed the premises Belmont Filmhouse as a sister cinema to the Edinburgh Filmhouse.  In October 2022 the Belmont Filmhouse closed when CMI ceased trading and entered administration. 

Belmont Filmhouse (also called Belmont Picturehouse) is a grade C listed building.

References

External links
Official website

Culture in Aberdeen
Cinemas in Scotland
Category C listed buildings in Aberdeen
1910 establishments in Scotland
2022 disestablishments in Scotland